The City of Edgewater is a home rule municipality located in Jefferson County, Colorado, United States. The city population was 5,005 at the 2020 United States Census. Edgewater is surrounded by Denver to the east, Lakewood to the south and west, and Wheat Ridge to the north. The city is a part of the Denver–Aurora–Lakewood, CO Metropolitan Statistical Area and the Front Range Urban Corridor.

History
Edgewater was named for its lakefront location at Sloan's Lake. The town was incorporated in 1901.

Geography
Sloan's Lake, a pond that once extended into Edgewater, now lies entirely within the city limits of Denver just to the east of Edgewater.

Climate
Edgewater features a Semi-arid climate, with low annual precipitation. Due to Edgewater bordering the city and county of Denver, the climates are almost exactly the same, with only a few differences. Annual snowfall is generally a bit less in Edgewater, and the high temperatures are also a few degrees warmer, due to the fact that Denver temperatures are recorded at the Denver International Airport, which is actually east of the Denver metro area.

Summers are hot and dry, while winters can vary from cool to cold, with snowfall not uncommon in winter months. However, snowfall is short lived in arid and sunny climates, usually melting in a day or sometimes before nightfall. Normal winter highs range from the mid 40s to the mid 50s, with upper  and lower  days very common as well. Sunshine is abundant throughout the year, averaging over 300 days of sun per year.

Demographics

As of the April 2010 census, there were 5,170 people, 2,698 households, and 1,329 families in the city. The population density was 7,630.4 inhabitants per square mile (2,961.0/km2). In the city, the population was spread out, with 23.8% under the age of 18, 7.2% from 18 to 24, 39.5% from 25 to 44, 20.1% from 45 to 64, and 9.4% who were 65 years of age or older. The median age was 33 years. For every 100 females, there were 100.2 males. For every 100 females age 18 and over, there were 98.9 males. The median income for a household in the city was $42,072, and the median income for a family was $42,815. The per capita income for the city was $22,696. About 17.5% of families and 23.2% of the population were below the poverty line, including 28.2% of those under age 18 and 12.3% of those age 65 or over.

The racial breakdown according to the April 2010 census:
 White 50.7%
 African American 2.7%
 Asian American 1.3%
 Hispanic or Latino 44.7%
 Other Race 0.3%
 An estimated 7.4% of the population were of two or more races.

Approximately 10.7% of the population that reside in Edgewater are not United States citizens. 14.3% of the population are foreign born United States citizens. The median house or condo value in 2009 was $199,114 and the median rent in 2009 was $702. An estimated 26.9% of the population over age 5 speak only Spanish at home. An estimated 48.9% of the housing are rentals, while 51.1% are owner occupied housing.

Infrastructure

Public services

The Edgewater Police Department is organized into three divisions with an authorized strength of fifteen officers and four civilian employees, with three part-time civilian employees working for the department and municipal court. The police dept. uses the Jefferson County Combined Communications Center as their dispatch and 911 center.

In November 2012, voters in Edgewater voted to disband the fire department and join the neighboring Wheat Ridge Fire Protection District.

Edgewater contracts out for emergency medical services with Pridemark Paramedic Services who respond from dynamic posts outside of the city limits.

Schools in Edgewater are Edgewater Elementary, Lumberg Elementary, and Jefferson High School.

Notable people
Notable individuals who were born in or have lived in Edgewater include:
 Nell Brinkley (1886-1944), illustrator
 Roy H. McVicker (1924-1973), U.S. Representative from Colorado
 Alan J. Pfeuffer, federal public defender, Edgewater police chief
 Johnnie Seale (1938- ), baseball pitcher

See also

Colorado
Bibliography of Colorado
Index of Colorado-related articles
Outline of Colorado
List of counties in Colorado
List of municipalities in Colorado
List of places in Colorado
List of statistical areas in Colorado
Front Range Urban Corridor
North Central Colorado Urban Area
Denver-Aurora, CO Combined Statistical Area
Denver-Aurora-Lakewood, CO Metropolitan Statistical Area

References

External links

City of Edgewater website
CDOT map of the City of Edgewater

Cities in Colorado
Cities in Jefferson County, Colorado
Denver metropolitan area